Ernocornutia altonapoana is a species of moth of the family Tortricidae. It is found in Napo Province, Ecuador.

The wingspan is 18 mm. The ground colour of the forewings is cream, with a slight brownish admixture and brown dots and suffusions. The markings are brown. The hindwings are cream with grey strigulation (fine streaks).

References

Moths described in 2009
Euliini
Moths of South America
Taxa named by Józef Razowski